HMS Royal James was a 100-gun first-rate ship of the line of the Royal Navy, designed by Sir Anthony Deane and built by his successor as Master Shipwright at Portsmouth Dockyard, Daniel Furzer, and launched in 1675. She was renamed HMS Victory on 7 March 1691 after the old second rate Victory of 1666 was condemned by survey and taken to pieces. Recommissioned in January 1691 under Captain Edward Stanley, as the flagship of Admiral Sir John Ashby she participated in the Battle of Barfleur on 19 May 1692 – 24 May 1692.

Victory was rebuilt at Chatham Dockyard in 1694–1695. She was briefly renamed Royal George in 1714, after the Hanoverians came to the throne, but resumed the name Victory in 1715. She was partly destroyed by an accidental fire in February 1721 and was broken up, though remained on the navy list until she was ostensibly rebuilt as the new .

Notes

References

Lavery, Brian (2003) The Ship of the Line – Volume 1: The development of the battlefleet 1650–1850. Conway Maritime Press. .
Winfield, Rif (2009) British Warships in the Age of Sail 1603–1714: Design, Construction, Careers and Fates. Seaforth Publishing. .

Ships of the line of the Royal Navy
1670s ships